Berepper is a coastal village in south Cornwall, England, United Kingdom. It is situated on the west side of the Lizard peninsula four miles (6 km) south of Helston, near Gunwalloe. Unusually for Cornish names it derives  from Norman French - 'beau-repaire', literally meaning 'beautiful retreat'. The Cornish name for it, 'Argelteg', is a literal translation meaning 'Pretty retreat'. It was Beauripper in 1476, Beaurepper in 1453, and Beureper in 1327 - all Anglo-Norman.

Berepper lies within the Cornwall Area of Outstanding Natural Beauty (AONB). Almost a third of Cornwall has AONB designation, with the same status and protection as a National Park.

References

External links

Villages in Cornwall
Populated coastal places in Cornwall